Jinanichthys is an extinct genus of osteoglossiform which existed in China during the early Cretaceous period. Species include J. longicephalus and J. major.

References

Osteoglossiformes
Prehistoric ray-finned fish genera
Early Cretaceous bony fish
Early Cretaceous fish of Asia
Jiufotang fauna